is a passenger railway station in the town of Hokota, Ibaraki Prefecture, Japan operated by the third sector Kashima Rinkai Railway.

Lines
Shin-Hokota Station is served by the Kashima Rinkai Railway’s Ōarai Kashima Line, and is located 31.0 km from the official starting point of the line at Mito Station.

Station layout
The station consists of a single elevated island platform with the station building underneath.

Platforms

History
Shin-Hokota Station was opened on 14 March 1985 with the opening of the Ōarai Kashima Line.

Passenger statistics
In fiscal 2015, the station was used by an average of 1485 passengers daily.

Surrounding area
Hokota City Hall
Hokota Post Office

Bus routes
Kantetsu Green Bus
For Hokota Station, Ibaraki Airport and Ishioka Station
For Tokyo Station via Itako Station and Sawara Station
Ibaraki Kotsu
For Narita Airport

See also
 List of railway stations in Japan

References

External links

  Kashima Rinkai Testudo Station Information 

Railway stations in Ibaraki Prefecture
Railway stations in Japan opened in 1985
Hokota, Ibaraki